Northowram is a village in Calderdale, West Yorkshire, England that stands to the east of Halifax on the north side of Shibden valley. Southowram stands on the southern side of the valley.

The village was documented in the 19th century as being in the parish of Halifax, 2½ miles north-east of Halifax and 6½ miles from Bradford. Its population at that point was 6,841 and Northowram Hall was the seat of J.F. Dyson, Esq. The ward is now called Northowram and Shelf. The population at the 2011 Census was 11,618.

The village has three churches: St Matthew's Church of England parish church, a Methodist church, and a Heywood United Reformed Church. St Matthew's is a Grade II listed building which is constructed of snecked local sandstone with a graded stone-slate roof. In addition, the village today has 21 shops and one school, Northowram Primary School.

The serial killer John Christie was born at Black Boy House near the village in 1899.

The village hosts an annual Scarecrow Festival.

See also
Listed buildings in Northowram

References

External links

A concise history of the parish and vicarage of Halifax, in the county of York  By John Crabtree Published 1836

 
Villages in West Yorkshire
Halifax, West Yorkshire